The Righteous may refer to:

The Righteous (1994 film), a French and Swiss documentary film directed by Marek Halter which was a César Award for Best Documentary Film nominee
, a Polish drama film directed by Michal Szczerbic 
The Righteous (2021 film), a Canadian psychological thriller film directed by Mark O'Brien
The Righteous (2023 film), a Russian military-historical drama directed by Sergei Ursulyak

See also
 
 Righteousness
 Righteous (disambiguation)